Natalie Rose Darwitz (born October 13, 1983) is an American ice hockey player.  Natalie was the Captain of the US Women's National Team for several seasons beginning with the 2007–08 season.  She won three World Championships between 2005 and 2009, and two Olympic silver medals and one bronze medal in Women's ice hockey for the US. She is currently the assistant coach for the Minnesota Golden Gophers women's ice hockey team.

Career biography 
Darwitz began skating at the age of five, and attended Eagan High School. From there, she was a veteran of ten years on the US National Team. She competed in two Olympics, leading the 2002 Olympics in goal scoring and scoring the game-winning assist in the bronze-medal game in the 2006 Games. In three years of NCAA Hockey at her alma mater, Minnesota, she won back-to-back national championships, scored the championship goal in her final game with 1:08 to go versus Harvard (4–3), won the Most Outstanding Player of the NCAA women's ice hockey tournament Frozen Four, was named US Women's Player of the Year, and competed in an additional three IIHF Women's World Championship.

At the '08 Worlds, Darwitz led the tournament in scoring and was named the Best Forward in the World by the International Ice Hockey Federation. She was also awarded the Bob Johnson Award by USA Hockey as the best male or female player representing the United States in international play.

In August 2008, Darwitz was named Assistant Coach of her alma mater, the University of Minnesota's, women's ice hockey team. At the conclusion of the 08–09 NCAA campaign, she left to return as a full-time member of the US National Team.

Darwitz was the second leading scorer at the 2009 IIHF tournament with 10 points (three goals, seven assists).

On August 2, 2011, she announced her new position as the head coach of the Lakeville South High School girls' ice hockey team.  The Lakeville South Cougars finished the 2011/2012 season with a record of 21–1–6. and the 2012/2013 season with a record of 16–2–9.

From the 2015–16 through 2020–21 seasons, she served as the Head Coach of the Hamline University women's ice hockey team. They finished the 2017–18 season by going to the Frozen Four and placing 3rd in the nation.  On July 29, 2021, she was hired as an Assistant Coach for her alma mater, the University of Minnesota Golden Gophers women's ice hockey team.

Personal life 
She is the youngest of three children (Nikki and Ryan); her parents are Scott and Nancy.

Collegiate biography 

She finished her three-season collegiate career as the University of Minnesota's (Western Collegiate Hockey Association) career points (246) and assists (144) leader.  She was a three-time finalist for the Patty Kazmaier Memorial Award and a three-time All-American.

As a junior (2004–05): Set an NCAA single-season record with 114 points (42-72) in 40 games
… Led the nation in points per game (2.85) and assists (72) … Set a tournament record with nine points (3-6) in two games at the NCAA Women's Frozen Four … In the final game, scored the go-ahead goal with under a minute remaining to give Minnesota its second straight national title …
Named the tournament's Most Outstanding Player and garnered All-America First Team honors …
Top-three finalist for the 2005 Patty Kazmaier Memorial Award.

As a sophomore (2003–04): All-America Second Team selection … 2004 Patty Kazmaier Memorial Award top-10 finalist … First
Team All-WCHA selection … Named to the WCHA All-Academic and Academic All-Big Ten teams …
Tied for second on the team in points (64), despite missing 10 games with an injury … Second in
goals (27) and assists (37)… Had a WCHA-best 28 power-play points (10-18) … Three-time WCHA
Offensive Player of the Week … Named to the WCHA All-Tournament Team … Scored her fourth hat
trick of the season to lead the team to victory in the national title game … Named to the NCAA Frozen Four All-Tournament Team.

As a freshman (2002–03): All-America First Team selection … 2003 Patty Kazmaier Memorial Award top-10 finalist … WCHA Rookie of the Year …
Team scoring leader (33-35–68) … First-Team All-WCHA selection and WCHA All-Rookie honoree..

Accomplishments and notes 
 2005 Bob Allen Women's Player of the Year Award - awarded by USA Hockey
 2005 NCAA Frozen Four Most Outstanding Player
 2002 Winter Olympic All Tournament Team - voted on by the International Ice Hockey Federation
 WCHA Team of the Decade (2000s)

Career statistics

International

Collegiate

Professional

References

Sources 
 Müller, Stephan : International Ice Hockey Encyclopedia 1904-2005 / BoD GmbH Norderstedt, 2005

External links 
 
  Natalie Darwitz - Biography from US Olympic Team.com 
 Natalie Darwitz Photo from US Olympic Media Summit Sept 2009
 

1983 births
American women's ice hockey forwards
Ice hockey players from Minnesota
Ice hockey players at the 2002 Winter Olympics
Ice hockey players at the 2006 Winter Olympics
Ice hockey players at the 2010 Winter Olympics
Living people
Medalists at the 2002 Winter Olympics
Medalists at the 2006 Winter Olympics
Medalists at the 2010 Winter Olympics
Minnesota Golden Gophers women's ice hockey players
Minnesota Whitecaps players
Olympic bronze medalists for the United States in ice hockey
Olympic silver medalists for the United States in ice hockey
Sportspeople from the Minneapolis–Saint Paul metropolitan area